David Pommerenke is an electrical engineer from the Graz University of Technology. He was named a Fellow of the Institute of Electrical and Electronics Engineers (IEEE) in 2015 for his work with system-level electrostatic discharge technology.

References

Fellow Members of the IEEE
Living people
Missouri University of Science and Technology faculty
Year of birth missing (living people)
Place of birth missing (living people)
American electrical engineers